Willendorf may refer to:

 Willendorf an der Schneebergbahn, Austria
 Willendorf in der Wachau, Austria
Venus of Willendorf a paleolithic figurine found in Willendorf in der Wachau
 Willendorf, a fictional place in the game Blood Omen: Legacy of Kain